Suzanne Dolores Luckey (April 4, 1938 – November 29, 2012) was an American actress, best known for her roles in the musical films Carousel (1956) and The Music Man (1962).

Early years 
Luckey was born in Hollywood, California, where her father was a sound editor in the film industry. She graduated in 1956 from Hollywood Professional School.
Luckey had a romance with race car driver Jack Martin while in her early teens.

Career

Stage
Luckey performed on Broadway during the 1950s, including the original 1954 adaptation of Peter Pan and Take Me Along.

Television
On television, Luckey was cast in The George Burns and Gracie Allen Show. She also appeared in the television movie version of Annie Get Your Gun in 1957. In 1957, she starred in the Telephone Time episode "Castle Dangerous".

Film
Luckey's best known film roles were in   Carousel and The Music Man. She co-starred as Louise, the daughter of Billy Bigelow, played by Gordon MacRae, in Carousel. She  appeared as Zaneeta, the daughter of Mayor Shinn (portrayed by Paul Ford), in The Music Man, repeating the role she had in the national company of that musical.  Her last film was the 1966 small movie, Step Out of Your Mind.

Family
In 1964, Luckey married actor Larry Douglas, who had divorced Onna White, Music Man's choreographer, in 1959. They remained married until his death in 1996. 

Luckey died in her home in Los Angeles, California, on November 29, 2012, at the age of 74, due to liver failure. She was survived by her daughter, Shayna.

References

External links
 
 
 
 
 

1938 births
2012 deaths
American film actresses
American stage actresses
American television actresses
Actresses from Hollywood, Los Angeles
21st-century American women